That Riviera Touch is a 1966 British comedy film directed by Cliff Owen and starring Eric Morecambe and Ernie Wise. It is the second feature-length film made by the comedy duo Morecambe and Wise.

The film opened at the Leicester Square Theatre in the West End of London on 24 March 1966.

Plot 
After Eric Simpson (Eric Morecambe) nearly gives The Queen a parking ticket in London, he and Ernest Clark (Ernie Wise) decide to take a holiday in the south of France. However, when they arrive there, they become unwittingly involved in a jewel theft when the thief Le Pirate (Paul Stassino) decides to use them to smuggle some precious jewels out of the country. He sends the two Englishmen to a sinister villa and sends the beautiful Claudette (Suzanne Lloyd), a member of his criminal gang, to keep Eric and Ernie occupied while he carries out the various stages of his plan. Confusion ensues however, as the two battle for the affections of Claudette and Eric accidentally wins a large sum of money at a casino. Eventually Eric and Ernie start to get suspicious and begin to investigate...

Cast 
Eric Morecambe - Eric Simpson
Ernie Wise - Ernest Clark
Suzanne Lloyd - Claudette
Paul Stassino - Le Pirate
Armand Mestral - Inspector Duval
Gerald Lawson - Coco
George Eugeniou - Marcel
George Pastell - Ali
Alexandra Bastedo - Girl at roulette table
Nicole Shelby - Woman in casino
Peter Jeffrey - Mauron
Francis Matthews - Hotel manager
Michael Forrest - Pierre
Paul Danquah - Hassim

Reception
That Riviera Touch was among the 15 most popular films at the British box office in 1966.

References

External links 
 
 

1966 films
1960s crime comedy films
British crime comedy films
Films scored by Ron Goodwin
Films about vacationing
Films directed by Cliff Owen
Films set in London
Films set on the French Riviera
Films shot at Pinewood Studios
Morecambe and Wise
1966 comedy films
1960s English-language films
1960s British films